A Girl of the Timber Claims is a 1917 American silent drama film directed by Paul Powell and starring Constance Talmadge, Allan Sears and Clyde E. Hopkins. It is based on the story "The Girl Homesteader," by Mary H. O'Connor, who also wrote the screenplay.

Cast

 Constance Talmadge as Jessie West 
 Allan Sears as Francis Ames 
 Clyde E. Hopkins as Bob Mullen 
 Beau Byrd as Cora Abbott 
 Wilbur Higby as Senator Hoyle 
 Bennie Schumann as Eddie Stanley 
 Joseph Singleton as Leather Hermit 
 F.A. Turner as Jess's Father 
 Margaret Talmadge as Mrs. Kiesey 
 Charles Lee as A Homesteader

References

Bibliography
 Jeanine Basinger. Silent Stars. Wesleyan University Press, 2000.

External links

1917 films
1917 drama films
Silent American drama films
Films directed by Paul Powell (director)
American silent feature films
1910s English-language films
American black-and-white films
Triangle Film Corporation films
1910s American films